Feng Jifeng is a Chinese oncologist at Jiangsu Cancer Hospital and Nanjing Medical University, both located in Nanjing, China. He specializes in the diagnosis and treatment of malignant tumors such as lung cancer, breast cancer, and lymphoma. He has a special interest in aspects of biotherapy and the correlation between dosage of chemotherapeutics and their curative effect and toxicity.
He currently holds the following positions:
Director of national pharmaceutical clinical trial institute in Jiangsu Cancer Hospital
Chief physician of Jiangsu Cancer Hospital
Director of Quality Control Centre of Jiangsu Medical Oncology and Chinese Medical Association
Vice director of Chinese Society of Clinical Cancer Chemotherapy of Chinese Anti-Cancer Association
Editor-in-chief of the Journal of International Translational Medicine

References

Medical journal editors
Living people
Chinese oncologists
Year of birth missing (living people)
Place of birth missing (living people)
Writers from Nanjing
People's Republic of China science writers
20th-century Chinese physicians
21st-century Chinese physicians
Physicians from Jiangsu